Rob & Big is an American reality television series following the lives of professional skateboarder, actor, and producer Rob Dyrdek and his best friend and bodyguard Christopher "Big Black" Boykin. It premiered on November 4, 2006, and concluded on April 15, 2008, after three seasons. Reruns air on the Pluto TV channel FunnyAF, and on MTV's sister network, MTV2. The series was followed by Fantasy Factory.

Synopsis
Most episodes follow a central task or event in the daily life of Rob and Big, such as attempting to break Guinness world records, having their home exorcised, skateboarding, buying 12 remote-control helicopters, and Rob's obsession with a net gun. They purchased two animals, a mini horse named Mini Horse and a bulldog named Meaty.

Boykin broke two Guinness world records on the show for eating the most powdered-sugar doughnuts in less than three minutes, and for peeling and eating the most bananas in one minute.

Cast

Main
Rob Dyrdek - professional skateboarder
Christopher "Big Black" Boykin - bodyguard and best friend
 Christopher "Drama" Pfaff - Rob's cousin and assistant
Rashawn "Bam Bam" Davis - second bodyguard
Meaty - Rob's Bulldog
Mini Horse - Rob's Melanesian short haired horse

Supporting
Patricia Dyrdek - Rob's mother
Gene Dyrdek - Rob's father
Otis "Big Zeus" Walton - a member of Big and Bam Bam's rap group, The Chunky Boyz
Steve Berra - Rob's friend and fellow skateboarder

Fantasy Factory
A one-hour series finale situated around Rob learning that Big's longtime girlfriend is pregnant, and Big moving out of the house to become a father. Rob's cousin, Christopher "Drama" Pfaff was featured in this season. However, two years later in an interview with friend and fellow MTV star Johnny Knoxville, Dyrdek gave more reasons for having ended the show.

The duo returned to MTV with the reality show, Rob Dyrdek's Fantasy Factory, which ended in 2015. Boykin died of heart failure on May 9, 2017 at age 45.

Episodes

References

External links
 

2000s American reality television series
2006 American television series debuts
2008 American television series endings
English-language television shows
MTV original programming